Evolvulus nuttallianus is a species of flowering plant in the morning-glory family known by the common name shaggy dwarf morning-glory. It is found in the central United States.

References

Taxa named by Carl Linnaeus
nuttallianus